Bearing Witness is a 2005 documentary by Barbara Kopple and Marijana Wotton.

Synopsis
It follows five women reporters and the challenges they face as they work in Iraq during the Second Gulf War. Molly Bingham is an experienced photographer who was held for several days at Abu Ghraib prison at the start of the war. Marie Colvin was a reporter who lost her eye to a grenade while working in Sri Lanka. Janine di Giovanni has to deal with the difficulties of becoming a mother and still working to fulfill her duties as a journalist. Mary Rogers is a camerawoman who continues to put herself in harm's way in an effort to get the proper footage to cover her stories.

Production
Bearing Witness was made for and premiered on the A&E television network on May 26, 2005. The film was invited to open the 2005 Full Frame Documentary Film Festival in Durham, North Carolina, with the subject that year being on "Why War?".

Reception
Alessandra Stanley of The New York Times was critical of the documentary, calling it a "beautifully shot feminist film with an oddly old-fashioned, Ladies Home Journal approach". Stanley was critical of the film boxing women into a sub-category of "women war correspondents" and the film's lack of focus on male and non-Western voices while also acknowledging the role that gender plays in their work.

References

External links
Cabin Creek Films - Bearing Witness

Documentary films about the Iraq War
2005 television films
2005 films
American documentary films
2005 documentary films
2000s American films